It's Over Now may refer to:

"It's Over Now" (112 song), 2000
"It's Over Now" (Cause & Effect song), 1994
"It's Over Now" (Deborah Cox song), 1999
"It's Over Now" (Jeanette song), 2003
"It's Over Now" (Luther Vandross song), 1985
"Well You Needn't", a 1944 jazz standard written by Thelonious Monk, sometimes recorded under the title "It's Over Now" with lyrics written by Mike Ferro in the 1970s
"It's Over Now", a song by The Beach Boys from the album Good Vibrations: Thirty Years of The Beach Boys
"It's Over Now", a song by Natasha Thomas from the album Save Your Kisses
"It's Over Now", a song by Ultra Naté from the album Blue Notes in the Basement

See also
 "It's All Over Now", a song written by Bobby Womack and Shirley Womack